Charnock Richard is a small village and civil parish in the borough of Chorley, Lancashire, in England. The population of the civil parish taken at the 2011 census was 1,748.

History
The village was named in the early 13th century by the local landowner, who gave the township his first name of Richard, to distinguish it from neighbouring Heath Charnock. The village is situated on the A49 road which leads from Preston to Wigan. The manor house Park Hall dates from the 10th century.

It was the home of Henry de Lea, who was beheaded with Adam Banastre on Leyland Moor in 1315, after the abortive Banastre Rebellion.

Local amenities
Charnock Richard Pasture is just off Freemans Lane, and is a Site of Special Scientific Interest. Charnock Richard Services, probably the area's most famous landmark, is a motorway service station, between Junctions 27 and 28 of the M6 Motorway. It was the first service station on the M6 when it opened in 1963 and is operated by Welcome Break.

Next to the service station stands the now derelict Camelot Theme Park. The park closed in November 2012, due to a lack of visitors and financial problems. The site has become a famous spot to explore for "urban explorers". Christ Church, a church of the Church of England, was built in 1860.

Sport
The village football club, Charnock Richard FC, plays at Mossie Park on Charter Lane, and currently competes in the North West Counties League. In June 2007, the club began work on redeveloping its ground to bring it up from West Lancashire League standards up to the higher standard required for the North West Counties League and for the higher Northern Premier League.

The first phase included a new pitch, largely enclosed with a spectators' stand, at a cost of about £60,000. The second phase included a new changing room building and the ground is now able to house 1,000 fans at games. These improvements helped the club to join the North West Counties League in 2016 from the West Lancashire League.

The club then saw success, progressing to the North West Counties Premier Division in 2017 afterfinishing second in the First Division, thus gaining promotion at the first attempt. 

It closed in July 2013, after being bought by the sports tracksuit seller Dave Whelan.

See also
Listed buildings in Charnock Richard

References

External links

Charnock Richard Parish Council
Charnock Richard, Chorley Council
Charnock Richard FC website
Charnock Richard GC

Geography of Chorley
Villages in Lancashire
Civil parishes in Lancashire